Michael Robert McNulty (born September 16, 1947) is a retired American politician from the U.S. state of New York. He served in the United States House of Representatives from 1989 to 2009 representing New York's Capital District and was chairman of the House Subcommittee on Social Security in the 110th Congress.

Early life, education, and early political career
McNulty was born in Troy, New York and attended Troy public schools. He attended the La Salle Institute and graduated from St. Joseph's Institute in 1965. He attended Loyola University Rome Center in Rome, Italy from 1967 to 1968. In 1969, McNulty graduated from the College of the Holy Cross in Worcester, Massachusetts.

McNulty is a member of the third generation of a Catholic, Irish-American family long prominent in Capital District politics. His grandfather, Jack McNulty Sr., was chairman of the Green Island, New York Democratic Party from 1919 to 1969 and Albany County Sheriff, and McNulty's father, Jack Jr., followed Jack Sr. as chairman. and also served as sheriff.

Michael McNulty worked as an insurance broker prior to entering politics. He was first elected to public office in November 1969 as Green Island's town supervisor; at 22, he was the youngest town supervisor in the state. In 1976, he ran for a seat in the New York State Assembly in the 106th Assembly District.  He lost to Republican incumbent Neil Kelleher 55%-46%. A year later, he succeeded his father as chairman of the Green Island Democratic Party and was also elected as mayor of the village of Green Island, a post he held until 1982.

New York Assembly
After redistricting in 1982, Assemblyman Neil W. Kelleher, of the old 106th District, ran in the new 100th Assembly District, and McNulty ran in the new 106th. McNulty was a member of the New York State Assembly from 1983 to 1988, sitting in the 185th, 186th and 187th New York State Legislatures.

U.S. House of Representatives

Elections 
In 1988, U.S. Congressman Samuel S. Stratton of New York's 23rd congressional district announced his withdrawal from the race due to health issues. McNulty was selected to replace him on the ballot.  He was elected handily in what was then one of the few reliably Democratic areas in Upstate New York.  He was reelected nine more times without serious difficulty.  The district was renumbered as the 21st District after the 1990 census.

In 2004, he was challenged by Republican/Libertarian Warren Redlich, who ran for governor in 2010. McNulty faced Redlich again in 2006, and was reelected with 78% of the vote - his widest margin. . He also had a primary challenge in 1996 by Lee H. Wasserman, in which he won by a closer margin than he ever had in the general election.

In October 2007, McNulty announced that he would not seek an 11th term in Congress.  Paul Tonko, who had served alongside McNulty in the State Assembly from 1983 to 1989, won the Democratic nomination to replace McNulty, and subsequently won the general election in November. Despite being an open seat, this was not considered a competitive election, as the 21st is considered the most Democratic district in the state outside of the New York City-based districts and Western New York.  Both Congressional Quarterly and the Cook Political Report rated the race for the 21st's open seat as "Safe Democratic."

Tenure
Positions
McNulty is a moderate Democrat by New York standards.  He voted for the War in Iraq, but since changed his stance and cosponsored Representative John Murtha's resolution for a phased withdrawal from the region.

Controversies

McNulty presided over a vote to recommit an agricultural appropriations bill on the night of August 2, 2007 that would have prevented illegal immigrants from receiving food stamps. McNulty claimed the vote tied 214-214 with members changing their votes after time had expired, McNulty gaveled down a vote and tallied it 212-216 against the motion, while Republicans argued the House screen tally vote was 215-213 in favor to recommit. Republicans chanted "Shame" and later walked out of the House in protest. McNulty and Steny Hoyer apologized on the floor the next morning for prematurely gaveling down the vote. In May 2008, a bipartisan investigation panel including Bill Delahunt and Mike Pence began working to determine whether the vote had been tallied correctly and what action should be taken, if any. A year later, the panel found that the Democrats did indeed improperly tally the vote.

Rankings/endorsements
He was consistently endorsed by both the Conservative Party and the Working Families Party, third parties in New York.

McNulty received an "A" on the Drum Major Institute's 2005 Scorecard on middle-class issues.

Committee assignments
Ways & Means Committee
Subcommittee on Social Security (Chairman)
Subcommittee on Income Security and Family Support
At-Large Whip

References

External links
 
 

1947 births
Living people
College of the Holy Cross alumni
Mayors of places in New York (state)
Democratic Party members of the New York State Assembly
Politicians from Troy, New York
Democratic Party members of the United States House of Representatives from New York (state)
21st-century American politicians
People from Albany County, New York
Catholics from New York (state)